Ernest Aldington Hunt  was Archdeacon of Matabeleland from 1942 to 1954.

Hunt was educated at the University of Queensland and ordained in 1920. After a curacy in Numurkah, New South Wales he held incumbencies at Wunghnu and Milawa.  He also worked as a school master  in Brisbane, Geelong and Toowoomba. He was Vicar of Saint John the Baptist, Newington from 1934 to 1941; a chaplain to the Forces from 1935 to 1942; and of All Saints, Pocklington from 1941 until his appointment as archdeacon.

References 

20th-century Anglican priests
Archdeacons of Matabeleland
University of Queensland alumni
People from Mumbai